Little River is an unincorporated community in Baldwin County, Alabama, United States. Its ZIP code is 36550.

Notes

Unincorporated communities in Baldwin County, Alabama
Unincorporated communities in Alabama